Ted Rand (1916-2005) was an illustrator who illustrated children's novels in his 60s, 70s, and 80s. He was born in 1916 on Mercer Island, WA. He started drawing early in his youth, traveled the world, and did portraits and advertising illustrations. He was a member of the Naval Air Corps during World War II. He became a graphic artist at Frederick & Nelson, and the Bon Marché, before founding a company called Graphic Studios. Rand also taught at the University of Washington for 20 years.

Rand illustrated 78 children's books. His drawings are on display around the country. He was awarded the Kerlan Award in May 2005 posthumously. Rand died of cancer, before he could accept the award. Some of his more recognizable works include the Salty Dog series, Jack Prelutsky, If Not for the Cat, and A Pen Pal for Max.

Bibliography
 The Big Book for Peace (1990) (Written by Jean Craighead George)

References

1916 births
2005 deaths
American illustrators
People from Mercer Island, Washington
United States Navy personnel of World War II
University of Washington faculty